Gatarić is a South Slavic surname that may refer to:
Dalibor Gatarić (born 1986), Bosnian-German football player
Danijel Gatarić (born 1986), Bosnian-German football player, twin brother of Dalibor
Nikola Gatarić (born 1992), footballer
Danijel Gatarić (born 1988), Serbian writer from Bosnia & Herzegovina 

Bosnian surnames
Serbian surnames